The Closer is an American sitcom television series that aired on CBS for 10 episodes from February 23 to May 4, 1998. The show starred Tom Selleck as a successful advertising agency executive.

Plot
Jack McLaren (Tom Selleck), a successful advertising executive, starts his own agency. The business, the employees in the agency, and his personal life provide the story lines. The characters include a creative director, Carl Dobson (Ed Asner), an accountant, Erica Hewitt (Penelope Ann Miller), and a bored secretary, Beverly (Suzy Nakamura); McLaren's estranged and eventually divorced wife, Claire McLaren (Joanna Kerns), and daughter Alex (Hedy Burress).

Cast
 Tom Selleck as Jack McLaren
 Hedy Burress as Alex McLaren
 Ed Asner as Carl "Dobbs" Dobson
 David Krumholtz as Bruno Verma
 Suzy Nakamura as Beverly Andolini
 Penelope Ann Miller as Erica Hewitt

Production
The project was originally started off at Paramount Television with Barry Kemp at the helm. Eventually, it parted ways and moved to project to Warner Bros., and recruited Ed Decter and John J. Strauss as the new writer/producing/showrunning team.

Director and writers
The director for the series was Andrew D. Weyman. It had the following writers:

 Tom Burkhard
 Howard Busgang
 Ed Decter
 David Kidd
 Laura Perkins-Brittain
 Ron Burch

Producers
 Howard Busgang
 Ed Decter
 Penny Segal
 Tom Selleck
 John J. Strauss
 Craig Wyrick-Solari

Episodes

Awards and nominations
 Emmy Award — Outstanding Music and Lyrics (for the song "You Don't Know Jack") (nominated)

References

External links
 
 

1990s American sitcoms
1998 American television series debuts
1998 American television series endings
Television shows set in Colorado
CBS original programming
English-language television shows
Television series by CBS Studios
Television series by Warner Bros. Television Studios